Paul's Tomb: A Triumph is a 2010 album by Canadian indie rock band Frog Eyes. It was a longlisted nominee for the 2010 Polaris Music Prize.

Critical reception
PopMatters called the album "the band’s most cohesive and expansive LP." Drowned in Sound wrote that "this record is at its best when it is direct, when [Carey] Mercer spews out gargled lines like a fountain, when it all clicks just so." The Village Voice wrote that the album "pitches the band at their most prolific and their most accessible, thanks to frequent burn-down-the-bar mitzvah-organ solos and Mercer’s quavering death cries."

Track listing
 "A Flower In a Glove" – 9:08
 "The Sensitive Girls" – 3:37
 "Odetta's War" – 6:22
 "Rebel Horns" – 4:22
 "Lear, In the Park"  1:56
 "Styled By Dr. Roberts" – 7:26
 "Lear In Love" – 4:33
 "Violent Psalms" – 3:59
 "Paul's Tomb" – 8:01

Personnel
Carey Mercer - vocals, guitar

References

Frog Eyes albums
2010 albums
Dead Oceans albums